USS Herndon has been the name of more than one United States Navy ship, and may refer to:

 , a Gleaves-class destroyer, commissioned in 1942 and decommissioned in 1946
 , a high-speed transport, in commission from 1944 to 1946

United States Navy ship names